Nyctimystes foricula, the Kaironk big-eyed tree frog, is a species of frog in the subfamily Pelodryadinae, endemic to Papua New Guinea. Its natural habitats are subtropical or tropical moist montane forests, rivers, rural gardens, and heavily degraded former forests.

Habitat
In the Upper Kaironk Valley of Madang Province, Papua New Guinea, it is found in water and rock clefts, and among Miscanthus cane, Ficus dammaropsis, Homalanthus, and other trees and foliage near water.

References

foricula
Amphibians of Papua New Guinea
Amphibians described in 1963
Endemic fauna of Papua New Guinea
Taxonomy articles created by Polbot